"One Step Too Far" is a song by British electronic music group Faithless. The track features member Rollo Armstrong's sister Dido on vocals and was remixed for single release. "One Step Too Far" was released on 8 April 2002 as the fourth and final single from their third studio album, Outrospective (2001). The song peaked at number six on the UK Singles Chart, number four on the US Dance Club Play chart, and number 21 on the Australian Singles Chart.

Track listings

UK CD single
 "One Step Too Far" (radio edit) – 3:24
 "One Step Too Far" (Rollo & Sister Bliss mix) – 7:43
 "One Step Too Far" (Alex Neri Club Rah mix edit) – 8:48

UK 12-inch single
A. "One Step Too Far" (Rollo & Sister Bliss mix)
B. "One Step Too Far" (Alex Neri club vocal)

European CD single
 "One Step Too Far" (radio edit) – 3:24
 "One Step Too Far" (Alex Neri Club Rah mix edit) – 8:48

Australian maxi-CD single
 "One Step Too Far" (radio edit) – 3:24
 "One Step Too Far" (Rollo & Sister Bliss mix) – 7:43
 "One Step Too Far" (Alex Neri Club Rah mix edit) – 8:48
 "One Step Too Far" (Absolute Beginners mix) – 6:32

US maxi-CD single
 "One Step Too Far" (radio edit) – 3:25
 "One Step Too Far" (Rollo & Sister Bliss remix) – 7:43
 "One Step Too Far" (Alex Neri Club Rah mix edit) – 8:48
 "We Come 1" (album version) – 8:02
 "One Step Too Far" (video)

US 12-inch single
A1. "One Step Too Far" (Absolute Beginners mix) – 6:31
A2. "One Step Too Far" (Rollo & Sister Bliss funky remix) – 6:46
B1. "One Step Too Far" (Alex Neri club vocal) – 9:22

Credits and personnel
Credits are adapted from the Outrospective album booklet.

Studios
 Recorded at Swanyard Studios (London, England)
 Mixed at the Ark
 Mastered at Metropolis Mastering (London, England)

Personnel

 Dido – writing, vocals
 Maxi Jazz – writing, rap
 Sister Bliss – writing, keyboards, production
 Rollo – writing, production, programming
 Grippa – engineering, sonic enhancement
 Peanut – engineering and sonic enhancement assistant
 Miles Showell – mastering

Charts

Release history

References

2001 songs
2002 singles
Arista Records singles
Bertelsmann Music Group singles
Cheeky Records singles
Dido (singer) songs
Faithless songs
Song recordings produced by Rollo Armstrong
Song recordings produced by Sister Bliss
Songs written by Dido (singer)
Songs written by Maxi Jazz
Songs written by Rollo Armstrong
Songs written by Sister Bliss